Andrea Clausen (born 17 January 1959) is a German stage actress and a member of the Burgtheater ensemble.

Life and theatre career 
Born in Oldenburg, Clausen first studied at the acting school of Étienne Decroux in Paris and then at the Folkwang University of the Arts in Essen. After her studies she made her debut as an actress in Oldenburg and in Cologne. In 1986 she moved to Bochum and began to work with Andrea Breth. In 1991 she went to the Burgtheater and worked as well with Claus Peymann, Hans Neuenfels and Wilfried Minks. In 1994, she went to the Schaubühne Berlin, returning two years later to Vienna.

She received a Kainz-Medaille for her acting in Who's Afraid of Virginia Woolf?.

Since 1996 she has worked with Matthias Hartmann, Luc Bondy, Karin Henkel, Paulus Manker, Theu Boermans and in many plays directed by Andrea Breth, such as The Cherry Orchard, Emilia Galotti, Minna von Barnhelm, Don Carlos and Motortown. One of her more famous roles was as Ines Finidori in Trois versions de la vie of Yasmina Reza (2000), which was first played in Vienna, at the Akademietheater.

Andrea Clausen is married, and in 2003 she had twin daughters named Marie and Jelena.

Since 2006 a large photography of Andrea Clausen, made by the Austrian photograph Ilse Haider, has been hanging in the Portrait Gallery of the Burgtheater.

Theatre roles

Schauspielhaus Bochum 
 Angelina in Sud (Julien Green; D: A. Breth)
 Girl in Summer (Edward Bond; D: A. Breth)
 Minna in Minna von Barnhelm (Lessing, D: U. Troller)
 Lucile in Dantons Tod (Büchner; D: F. P.Steckel)
 Olivia in Twelfth Night, or What You Will (Shakespeare, D: A. Breth)

Schaubühne am Lehniner Platz, Berlin 
 Elektra in  Elektra (Euripides, D: A. Breth)

Burgtheater and Akademietheater, Vienna 
 Marie in Clavigo (Goethe, D: C. Peymann)
 Eve in Der zerbrochne Krug (Kleist, D: A. Breth)
 Honey in Who's Afraid of Virginia Woolf? (Edward Albee; D: H. Neuenfels)
 Julie in Liliom (Molnár; D: P. Manker)
 Nora in A Doll's House (Ibsen; D: K. Henkel)
 Isabella in Edward II (C. Marlowe; D: C. Peymann)
 Irene in Tochter der Luft (Hans Magnus Enzensberger/Calderón de la Barca, D: Frank Castorf
Ramona in Viridiana of Luis Buñuel (D: Dimiter Gotscheff)
 Ines in Drei Mal Leben (Reza; D: L. Bondy), Akademietheater
 Countess Orsina in Emilia Galotti (Lessing; D: A. Breth)
Marchioness Mondecar in Don Carlos (Schiller, D: A. Breth) 2004
 Ranevskaya in The Cherry Orchard (Chekhov; D: A. Breth) 2005
 A Mourning women in  Minna von Barnhelm (Lessing, D: A. Breth) 2005
 Hippolyta and Titania in A Midsummer Night's Dream (Shakespeare, R: Theu Boermans) 2007
 Helen in Motortown (Simon Stephens, D: A. Breth) 2008

Movies 
2003: Brüder (Brothers), D: W Murnberger/ORF
1994: Kopf des Mohren (The Moor's Head), D: Paulus Manker
1983: Fremdes Land (Strange Country) D: Claus Peter Witt

Audio 
 Speaker in the audio book Geboren in Bagdad Susanne Ayoub 2004, Hoffman und Campe Verlag
 Speaker (Clelia) in the audio-drama Unter Frauen (Tra donne sole) of Cesare Pavese, 2006 (D: Götz Fritsch, ORF)

Awards 
1987: Best young actress (theatre-magazine Theater heute)
1992: Kainz-Medaille
2001, 2003 und 2005: nominated for the Nestroy Theatre Prize in the category Best Actress
2007: ORF-Audio-Award (ORF-Hörspielpreis) Actress of the Year 2006

External links
 

German stage actresses
1959 births
Living people
People from Oldenburg (city)
German voice actresses
German film actresses